The women's pentathlon at the 2014 IAAF World Indoor Championships took place on 7 March 2014.

Medalists

Records

Qualification standards
Eight athletes were invited by  the  IAAF in the Heptathlon 
and in the Pentathlon as follows: 
  the winner of the 2013 Combined Events Challenge 
  the three best athletes from the 2013 Outdoor Lists (as at 31 December 2013), limited to a maximum of one per country 
  the three best athletes from the 2014 Indoor Lists (as at 17 February 2014) 
  one athlete which was invited at the discretion of the IAAF 
In  total no more  than  two male and  two  female athletes  from any one Member were invited.  Upon  refusals  or  cancellations,  the  invitations  should  be  extended  to  the  next ranked athletes in the same lists respecting the above conditions.

Schedule

Results

60 metres hurdles

High jump

Shot put

Long jump

800 metres

Final standings

References

Pentathlon
Combined events at the World Athletics Indoor Championships
2014 in women's athletics